The 2016–17 Vanderbilt Commodores men's basketball team represented Vanderbilt University in the 2016–17 NCAA Division I men's basketball season. This was Bryce Drew's first year as the Vanderbilt head coach. The Commodores played their home games at Memorial Gymnasium in Nashville, Tennessee as members of the Southeastern Conference. They finished the season 19–16, 10–8 in SEC play to finish in a three-way tie for fifth place. They defeated Texas A&M and Florida in the SEC tournament before losing in the semifinals to Arkansas. They received an at-large bid to the NCAA tournament where they lost in the First Round to Northwestern. Vanderbilt entered the NCAA Tournament with 15 losses, the most ever by any at-large team.

Previous season
The Commodores finished the 2015–16 season 19–14, 11–7 in SEC play to finish in a three-way tie for third place. They lost in the second round of the SEC tournament to Tennessee. They received an at-large bid to the NCAA tournament where they lost in the First Four to Wichita State.

On March 27, 2017, head coach Kevin Stallings resigned to become the head coach at Pittsburgh. Shortly thereafter, the school hired Valparaiso head coach Bryce Drew as head coach.

Offseason

Departures

Incoming transfers

2016 recruiting class

2017 recruiting class

Roster

Schedule and results

|-
!colspan=9 style=| Regular season

|-
!colspan=9 style=| SEC Tournament

|-
!colspan=9 style=|NCAA tournament

See also
 2016–17 Vanderbilt Commodores women's basketball team

References

Vanderbilt
Vanderbilt Commodores basketball
Vanderbilt
Vanderbilt Commodores men's basketball
Vanderbilt Commodores men's basketball seasons